The Light is the debut studio album of Filipino boy band BGYO. It was released by Star Music on 7 October 2021. The album contains twelve tracks, with "When I'm With You" as its key single, four new tracks "Kundiman," "Fly Away," "Sabay," and "Rocketman", which BGYO co-written, four versions of the band's debut single in Bahasa, Japanese, Spanish and Thai, along with the group's signature hits The Light, He's Into Her and The Baddest. The album's lyrical content transcends the spirit of resilience, empathy, and love.

The album debuts and peaks at number 1 on iTunes Albums Chart in 5 countries—Philippines, Hong Kong, Singapore, United Arab Emirates and Saudi Arabia. It also charted in Canada, Thailand, Qatar, Australia, Norway, Malaysia and Mexico; and has achieved the coveted feat of being the longest consecutive charting album by a Filipino act to stay at number one on iTunes Philippines of all time.

The album surpassed 5 million Spotify streams, 2 weeks since its release.

Background and release
On 11 June 2021, ABS-CBN Entertainment head Laurenti Dyogi made a statement during the official debut of BGYO's sister group Bini on the upcoming projects of the sibling groups—full-length albums, merch and the "One Dream: The BINI x BGYO Concert". On 28 September 2021, the group's official social media account announced the schedules and the release of the debut album. Tracklist of the album was revealed on 29 September 2021 and audio sampler on 6 October 2021.

Composition

Singles
The Light yielded four singles. The debut single, "The Light", was released in January 2021. The music video of "The Light" has received more than a million YouTube views, 6 days after its release, and its the fastest debut music video by a P-pop group to reach 1 Million views in YouTube. It also broke the record for being the "Most Liked Music Video in a Debut Song" by a P-pop group of all time. The album's second single "He's Into Her" was released in April 2021 and became the official soundtrack of the original iWantTFC series He's Into Her. "The Baddest" was released in August 2021 as the group's sophomore single and released as the album's fifth single. American hip-hop dance crew Jabbawockeez posted a dance cover of the track in social media and went viral in October 2021. "When I'm with You" was released in October 2021 as the album's third single and key track.

Track listing
All song credits are adapted from the album sampler released by BGYO's label Star Music in YouTube, unless otherwise noted.

Awards and nominations

Release history

See also
BGYO discography
List of BGYO live performances

References

BGYO albums
2021 debut albums
Star Music albums
Pop albums by Filipino artists